State Route 178 (SR 178) is part of Maine's system of numbered state highways, located along the east side of the Penobscot River northeast of Bangor. It runs from State Street in Brewer (where it is concurrent with SR 9) north to Milford where it terminates at U.S Route 2 (US 2) just east of Old Town.

Route description
SR 178 begins in the south in Brewer, at the intersection of North Main Street (SR 9) and State Street.  It begins overlapped with SR 9.  The two routes proceed concurrently along the Penobscot River for  towards Eddington. After crossing the town line, SR 178 splits to the north while SR 9 (also known as Airline Highway on this stretch) continues east.

SR 178 continues northward along the river, passing through the town of Bradley before reaching Milford where it terminates at US 2 (which crosses the river from Old Town, just to the west).

History

Southern terminus in Brewer

The southern terminus of SR 178 is somewhat strange in that it is not located at an intersection with another numbered route; SR 178 instead ends at State Street, while SR 9 continues on North Main Street for one block towards modern US 1A.

State Street was, in the past, part of a numbered highway - US 1A Business.  This business route, which has since been decommissioned, was designated in 1955 over what used to be US 1 Business, and US 1A before that, meaning SR 178 has historically terminated at one of these routes.  When these historical designation(s) were removed, SR 178's terminus was never moved, and thus it now terminates along SR 9 one block north of its terminus with US 1A.

Major junctions

References

External links

Maine State Route Log via floodgap.com

178
Transportation in Penobscot County, Maine